Allium callimischon is a plant species native to southwestern Turkey and to southern Greece (including Peloponnese and the Island of Crete). It is grown in other countries as an ornamental because of its attractive flowers.

Allium callimischon  is a perennial herb up to 30 cm tall. It has small bulbs and thread-like leaves. Flowers are borne in an umbel, white with thin purple midveins on the tepals.

References

callimischon
Flora of Greece
Flora of Turkey
Flora of Crete
Peloponnese
Garden plants of Asia
Plants described in 1834
Taxa named by Johann Heinrich Friedrich Link